Dad and Dave from Snake Gully was an Australian radio drama series based on the On Our Selection stories of Steele Rudd. The series is more often referred to simply as Dad and Dave.

The theme tune was "The Road to Gundagai".  The standard accent used by actors and announcers in Australian broadcasting at the time was typically "Southern English", an upper class British version that emulated the BBC. The actual Australian accent was however acceptable only in low comedy productions as in this series "Dad and Dave from Snake Gully."

This famous Australian radio drama series can still be heard on Melbourne's Golden Days Radio 95.7FM (GDR95.7fm) every Saturday morning at 8.30am. The program is streamed around the world on www.goldendaysradio.com at that time. Dad and Dave is also heard on Vintage FM (87.6 Hawkesbury, 87.8 Penrith and 88.7 Camden) weekdays at 4am, 10:30am and 9pm & in Newcastle Newy 87.8 FM daily at 2am

Cast
George Edwards and Lou Vernon as Dad
Max Osbiston and John Saul as Dave
Nell Stirling and Margaret Christensen as Mabel
Lorna Bingham as Annie Morton
Loris Bingham and Hope Suttor as Mum
George Edwards and Tom Farley as Alf Morton
George Edwards and Rodney Jacobs as Ted Ramsay
Dorothy Whitely as Rita Ramsay
Eric Scott as Bill Smith
Ethel Gabriel as Mrs. Smith
Lyndall Barbour as Madame Deemer
Warren Barry and Ken Fraser as Ernie Crossley
Hannah Coulter as Pearl
Timothy Coulter as Mick

References

External links
Dad and Dave from Snake Gully at Australian Screen Online
Dad and Dave from Snake Gully at National Film and Sound Archive
Copies of early episodes at Internet Archive

Australian radio dramas
1937 establishments in Australia
1953 disestablishments in Australia